Zaila Avant-garde (born February 9, 2007) is an American speller, basketball player, and juggler. She won the 2021 Scripps National Spelling Bee. She is the first African-American contestant to win the bee and is the second Black winner, after Jamaica's Jody-Anne Maxwell.

Life 
Avant-garde was born on February 9, 2007, in Harvey, Louisiana, the daughter of Alma Heard and Jawara Spacetime. Her father chose her last name to honor John Coltrane. She has cited Malala Yousafzai, Serena Williams, and Coco Gauff as inspirations. Her basketball heroes include Steph Curry, James Harden, Diana Taurasi, Kevin Durant and Maya Moore.

Spelling bee 
Avant-garde reached the nationals in the 2019 Bee. She used SpellPundit to learn circa 12,000 words. Her coach is former Scripps finalist Cole Shafer-Ray, who also coached runner-up Chaitra Thummala. In the 2021 competition, she won the title by correctly spelling murraya. Over pandemic concerns, only the 11 finalists competed in person, in a session that took fewer than 2 hours. First place comes with $50,000 in cash and prizes. She is the first African American contestant to win the competition, and was preceded by MacNolia Cox, who reached the finals in the 1936 edition.

Basketball 

She is one of the top eighth-grade basketball prospects in the US. Avant-garde is the holder of three basketball Guinness World Records and co-holder of another. Her parents gave her a copy of the Guinness book for her eighth birthday, which triggered her ambition.

On November 14, 2019, she broke her first record, for most bounce juggles in one minute (three basketballs) at 231. That day she also set the record for most bounces of four basketballs in 30 seconds (307). On November 2, 2020, she set the record for most bounce juggles in one minute, using four basketballs (255). She is the co-holder of the record for most basketballs dribbled at one time (six) — set on Jan. 26, 2021 (equalling Joseph Odhiambo’s August 2000 record).

Juggling 
Avant-garde was the silver medalist at the International Jugglers' Association 2020 championship in the Juniors Division (18U). She is an elite unicyclist and can juggle and cycle simultaneously.

References

External links 

 

African-American children
Scripps National Spelling Bee participants
Guinness World Records
Jugglers
People from Harvey, Louisiana
2007 births
Living people
Unicyclists